The Ministry of National Education, also translated as Ministry of National Enlightenment, was a government ministry in the Russian Empire which oversaw science and education. It was in existence from 1802 to 1817 and from 1824 to 1917. From 1817 to 1824, it was part of the Ministry of Religious Affairs and Public Education.

Ministers 
List of Ministers of National Enlightenment

See also
 Ministry of Education (Russia)
 Ministry of Education (Soviet Union)

Russia
Russia

Education
1802 establishments in the Russian Empire
1917 disestablishments in Russia